Wu Di (吴镝, born April 23, 1979 in Fushun, Liaoning Province) is a Chinese renju player. He won the Renju World Championship in 2007, becoming the first Renju world champion from China.  In 2008, he achieved third place in Renju Team World Championship playing on the second table of Chinese team.

References

Living people
1979 births
Renju world champions
Chinese Renju players